The East Glacier Ranger Station, east of Glacier National Park, is characteristic of park buildings constructed in the 1920s and 1930s. It was designed by Daniel Ray Hull of the National Park Service Office of Plans, as a frame building compatible in style with the prevailing National Park Service Rustic style. It is the center of a group of related buildings, including several residential structures.

East Glacier, Montana was an arrival point for tourists arriving by rail in the park.  Until the 1920 completion of US 2 and the Going-to-the-Sun Road, the east side of the park was isolated from the headquarters at West Glacier. The new ranger station complex at East Glacier was proposed to provide administrative services to the east side. In 1937, with the completion of the Going-to-the-Sun Road the more convenient Saint Mary Ranger Station took over maintenance duties, and four buildings at East Glacier were demolished by Civilian Conservation Corps workers.

References

Ranger stations in Glacier National Park (U.S.)
Park buildings and structures on the National Register of Historic Places in Montana
Civilian Conservation Corps in Montana
National Park Service rustic in Montana
Historic districts on the National Register of Historic Places in Montana
National Register of Historic Places in Glacier County, Montana